James Brown is a correspondent on the Russian TV channel RT.

Life
Originally from Devon, England. James moved to Moscow in 2005 to work for the newly founded Russian TV news network Russia Today.  He lives in Moscow.

Television work
Brown has written and presented documentaries for RT, including a two part programme on the Russian Paratrooper regiment VDV which aired in October 2013. Since 2015, he has focused on social and human interest documentaries around the world, and worked in news.

Other media
Brown has written travel and adventure articles and featured in interviews for newspapers, magazines and online publications, including Voice of Russia Radio, Think Russia, Russian Life, Russia UK, Sidetracked Magazine, Russian Art and Culture  In Your Pocket   and the Herald Express

References

British male journalists
Living people
RT (TV network) people
Year of birth missing (living people)